The Palmetto was a night train between New York, New York and two different Georgia destinations, Augusta and Savannah.  It was operated by the Atlantic Coast Line Railroad, with the cooperation of the Richmond, Fredericksburg and Potomac Railroad and the Pennsylvania Railroad. During its final year it was operated by the Seaboard Coast Line Railroad (the post-merger successor of the Atlantic Coast Line Railroad).

Train origins

The train began in 1944. It had its origins in the ACL's Palmetto Limited (initiated in 1910). In addition to its main terminal points in Augusta and Savannah, the Palmetto had a branch that went to Wilmington, North Carolina's Union Station. At Augusta Union Station the train had a connection to Georgia Railroad's train from Augusta to Atlanta's Union Station.

Decline
In the 1960s the ACL and SCL cut some of the Palmetto's services. By 1963 the ACL trimmed its south of Richmond meal services to a cafe-lounge between Florence and Augusta, leaving the Savannah and Wilmington branches without food catering. By 1965, the Savannah branch was dropped and Wilmington-bound riders had to change to another train at Rocky Mount. Between December 1967 and 1968, the train was dropped from the SCL's timetables. Its Wilmington branch was the last train to serve Wilmington and its Union Station.

In 1976, Amtrak resurrected the name for a New York-Florida train; that train's route was shortened to end at Savannah in 2004.

References

Named passenger trains of the United States
Night trains of the United States
Passenger rail transportation in Delaware
Passenger rail transportation in Georgia (U.S. state)
Passenger rail transportation in Maryland
Passenger rail transportation in New Jersey
Passenger rail transportation in New York (state)
Passenger rail transportation in North Carolina
Passenger rail transportation in South Carolina
Passenger trains of the Atlantic Coast Line Railroad
Passenger trains of the Seaboard Coast Line Railroad
Railway services introduced in 1944
Railway services discontinued in 1968